Rachel Levin may refer to:

Rachel Levin (author), journalist and novelist
Rachel Levin (influencer), American YouTuber and beauty guru

See also
Rahel Varnhagen (1771–1833), also known as Rahel Levin, German writer and salonniere
Rachel Levine (born 1957), pediatrician